This is a list of people who were either born or have lived in the Bronx, a borough of New York City, at some time in their lives.  Many of the early historical figures lived in that part of Westchester County which later became part of the Bronx.

Academics and science 

 Richard Alba (born 1942) – Distinguished CCNY Professor of ethnicity and assimilation 
 Jill Bargonetti (born 1962) – biologist and Presidential Early Career Award winner
 Marshall Berman (1940–2013) – philosopher of modernity; author of All That Is Solid Melts into Air
 Norman Birnbaum (1926–2019) – author, educator, political advisor; University Professor Emeritus, Georgetown University Law Center; taught at Amherst College, London School of Economics, Oxford University, University of Strasbourg
 Ira Black (1941–2006) – neuroscientist and stem-cell researcher; first director of the Stem Cell Institute of New Jersey
 Xavier Briggs (born 1968) – Former professor of planning at MIT, former associate director of Office of Management and Budget, former vice-president of Ford Foundation. Sometimes known as "Xavier de Souza Briggs"
 Roscoe Brown (1922–2016) – Tuskegee airman, exercise physiologist, President, Bronx Community College, New York City political adviser
 Morton Deutsch (1920–2017) – conflict resolution expert
 W.E.B. Du Bois (1868–1963) – sociologist, historian, civil rights activist, Pan-Africanist.
 Gertrude B. Elion (1918–1999) – Nobel Prize biochemist and pharmacologist
 Murray Gell-Mann (1929–2019) –  Nobel Prize physicist of sub-atomic particle.
 Todd Gitlin (born 1943) – sociologist; co-founder of Students for a Democratic Society
 Fred Greenstein (1930–2018) – political scientist who psychologically assessed U.S. presidents
 Henry Heimlich (1920–2016) – physician inventor of the Heimlich maneuver
 Matthew Henson (1866–1955) – Explorer, co-discoverer of the North Pole (with Robert Peary)
 Gary Hermalyn (born 1953) – Centennial Historian of New York City, Edgar Allan Poe scholar
 Irving Howe (1920–1993) – literary critic, socialist writer, author of World of Our Fathers 
 Samuel P. Huntington (1927–2008) – Government Professor at Harvard University; co-editor of Foreign Policy; author of political science works related to the modernization of societies, particularly those of developing nations
 Barbara Jasny (born 1952) – deputy editor of Science; co-editor Catalysts, Women of Science Fiction
 Adrian Kantrowitz (1918–2008) – cardiac-surgery pioneer
 Arthur Kantrowitz (1913–2008) – nose cone physicist; co-inventor of the intra-aortic balloon pump
 Jeffrey Lane – urban ethnographer, Rutgers University
 Robert Lefkowitz (born 1943) – 2012 recipient of Nobel prize for chemistry of protein receptors
 Howard Lesnick (1931–2020) – Jefferson B. Fordham Professor of Law, University of Pennsylvania Law School
 Norman Levitt (1943–2009) – mathematician at Rutgers University
 Paul Levinson (born 1947) – science-fiction and non-fiction author; communications professor
 Kenneth Lewes (1943–2020) – psychoanalyst who challenged prejudicial view of homosexuality.
 Ronald Mallett (born 1945) – theoretical physicist of time travel
 Barry Mazur (born 1937)  – mathematician and Fellow of the National Academy of Sciences
 Joseph M. McShane (born 1942) – Jesuit priest; president of Fordham University
 Stanley Milgram (1933–1984) – psychologist known for obedience to authority and small world studies
 Joseph A. O'Hare (1931–2020) – Jesuit priest; longest-serving president of Fordham University (1984–2003); first chair of New York City Campaign Finance Board (1988–2003)
 Jay Pasachoff (1943–2022) – astronomer, umbraphile
 Carolyn Porco (born 1953) – planetary scientist; leader of the Cassini space observatory team at the Colorado Space Science Institute, studying Saturn
 Allan Pred (1936–2007) – geographer at University of Chicago and University of California, Berkeley
 Howard Raiffa (1924–2016) – economist; negotiation scientist
 Murray Rothbard (1926–1995) – economist; helped define modern libertarianism
 Ken Schaffer (born 1947) – inventor; invented the wireless guitar system, video placeshifting
 Joseph Francis Shea (1925–1999) – aerospace engineer; headed NASA's Apollo program
 Gary Simons – founder of Prep for Prep gifted education program in NYC
 Robert Sobel (1931–1999) – historian and writer; history professor at Hofstra University; writer of business histories
 Edward Soja (1940–2015) – postmodern political geography and urban theorist at UCLA
 Michael I. Sovern (1931–2020) – Chancellor Kent Professor of Law and President Emeritus of Columbia University
 Robert Spinrad (1932–2009) – computer designer; director of the Xerox Palo Alto Research Center
 Mark Steiner (1942–2020) – professor of philosophy of mathematics and physics at the Hebrew University of Jerusalem
 Leonard Susskind (born 1940) – theoretical physicist
 Neil deGrasse Tyson (born 1959) – astrophysicist; director of the American Museum of Natural History's Hayden Planetarium; host of PBS's educational-television series NOVA scienceNOW and Cosmos: A SpaceTime Odyssey (2014) and Cosmos: Possible Worlds (2020).
 Lloyd Ultan (historian) (born 1938) – official historian of the Bronx
 Allen Weinstein (1937–2015) – historian; Archivist of the United States
 Barry Wellman (born 1942) – sociologist; University of Toronto professor studying social networks, community and the Internet
 Rosalyn Sussman Yalow (1921–2011) – medical physicist; co-winner of the 1977 Nobel Prize in Physiology or Medicine
 Yosef Hayim Yerushalmi (1932–2009) – historian; Salo Baron Professor of Jewish history at Columbia University

Arts

Architecture, art and photography

 Vito Acconci (1940–2017) – architect, landscape architect and installation artist
 Robert Altman (born 1944) – photographer
 Richard Avedon (1923–2004) – photographer
 Alvin Baltrop (1948–2004) – photographer
 Margaret Bourke-White (1904–1971) – photographer (including documentary photographer)
 Cope2 (born 1968) – graffiti artist
 Willie Cole (born 1955) – artist; uses found material such as his "America" blackboard
 Ralph Fasanella (1914–1997) – painter
 Ron Galella (born 1931) – paparazzo photographer
 Horace Ginsbern (1902–1987) – architect; designed the landmark Art Deco Park Plaza Apartments on Jerome Avenue in the Bronx, and other New York City structures
 Milton Glaser (1929–2020) – graphic designer; designer of the "I Love New York" logo
 Garry Gross (1937–2010) – fashion photographer (including nude images of Brooke Shields at age ten), dog portraiture photographer and dog trainer
 Sabin Howard (born 1963) – figurative sculptor, noted for U.S. World War I national monument
 Al Held (1928–2005) – abstract painter; associated with Abstract expressionism, Hard-edge and Color Field painting
 Joel Iskowitz (born 1946) – illustrator, artist, designer for United States Mint
 Marcey Jacobson (1911–2009) – photographer; images of daily life in Chiapas, Mexico
 C. Paul Jennewein (1890–1978) – sculptor
 Ivan Karp (1926–2012) – art dealer
 Stanley Kubrick (1928–1999) – director, screenwriter, editor, cinematographer, storyteller
 Ronnie Landfield (born 1947) – abstract painter; associated with lyrical abstraction, and color field painting
 Daniel Libeskind (born 1946) – architect
 Glenn Ligon (born 1960) – conceptual artist
 Whitfield Lovell (born 1959) – painter and installation artist; focuses on African-American themes; MacArthur Fellow (2007)
 Jules Maidoff (born 1933) – artist, teacher and founder of Studio Art Centers International, Florence, Italy
 Gerard Malanga (born 1943) – poet, photographer, filmmaker, actor, curator and archivist
 Joel Meyerowitz (born 1938) – photographer
 Rick Meyerowitz (born 1943) – artist
 Ralph Morse (1917–2015) – photographer
 Piccirilli Brothers (including father, Giuseppe Piccirilli (1844–1910), and his six sons – Ferruccio (1864–1945), Attilio (1866–1945), Furio (1868–1949), Masaniello (1870–1951), Orazio (1872–1954) and Getulio (1874–1956)) – sculptors
 Larry Rivers (1923–2002) – artist
 Joel Arthur Rosenthal (born 1943) – jeweler
 Merryll Saylan (born 1936) – woodturner 
 Edwin Scheier (1910–2008) – artist
 Phil Stern (1919–2014) – Hollywood, WWII and White House photographer
 George Sugarman (1912–1999) – sculptor
 Raven B. Varona – photographer.
 Lawrence Weiner (1942-2021) – artist; associated with conceptual art
 Marian Zazeela (born 1940) – light artist, painter, and set designer; also musician of Hindustani classical music

Journalists and writers

 Sholem Aleichem (1859–1916) – author
 William Henry Appleton (1814–1899) – publisher
 Army Archerd (1922–1999) – columnist for Variety
 James Baldwin (1924–1987) – playwright and essayist
 Harold Bloom (1930–2019) – literary critic
 Leslie Brody (born 1952) – non-fiction author
 Robert Caro (born 1935) – non-fiction author of biographies of Robert Moses and Lyndon Johnson
 Jerome Charyn (born 1937) – prolific novelist and author of several memoirs
 Mary Higgins Clark (1927–2020) – best-selling author of suspense novels
 Avery Corman (born 1935) – novelist; author of The Old Neighborhood, set in the Bronx
 Don DeLillo (born 1936) – novelist
 E. L. Doctorow (1931–2015) – author
 Will Eisner (1917–2005) – author of A Contract with God and other graphic novels and instruction books
 Jules Feiffer (born 1929) – cartoonist (primarily in The Village Voice); playwright, screenwriter
 Bill Finger (1917–1974) – writer co-creator of Batman comic book
 Vivian Gornick (born 1935) – American critic, journalist, essayist, and memoirist
 Marilyn Hacker (born 1942) – poet, critic, reviewer
 Phil Hall (born 1964) – film critic
 Hy Hollinger (1918–2015) – journalist for Variety and The Hollywood Reporter
 Max Kadushin (1895–1980) – rabbi, theologian and author at Conservative Synagogue Adath Israel of Riverdale
 Bel Kaufman (1911–2014) – novelist author of Up the Down Staircase about NYC schools in the 1950s
 William Melvin Kelley (1937–2017) – novelist, short-story writer, university professor
 Annie Lanzillotto (born 1963) – poet, author, dramatist, songwriter
 Stan Lee (1922–2018) – leading creator of Marvel Comics
 Paul Levinson (born 1947) – science fiction and non-fiction author
 Anthony Lewis (1927–2013) – New York Times legal reporter, specializing in coverage of the U.S. Supreme Court
 Eleazar Lipsky (1911-1993) – lawyer, novelist, playwright, president of the Jewish Telegraphic Agency
 Miles Marshall Lewis (born 1970) – pop-culture critic
 Kenneth Lonergan (born 1962) – playwright and screenwriter
 Lynda Lopez (born 1971) – journalist, multiple broadcast networks
 Ray Marcano – medical reporter and music critic
 John Matteson (born 1961) – Pulitzer Prize–winning biographer
 Judith Merril (1923–1997) – science-fiction editor and author
 Steve Mirsky – Scientific American columnist
 Nicholasa Mohr (born 1938) – Nuyorican writer about Puerto Rican women in New York
 Mwalim (born 1968) – playwright, composer, and novelist
 Davi Napoleon (born 1946) – theater historian and arts journalist
 Clifford Odets (1906–1963) – playwright, co-founder of the Group Theatre
 Cynthia Ozick (born 1928) – award-winning novelist and short-story writer
 Grace Paley (1922–2007) – award-winning short-story writer
 Michael Pearson (born 1949) – Old Dominion University English professor and author of several books, including his memoir, Dreaming of Columbus: A Boyhood in the Bronx
 David J. Pecker (born 1951) – CEO of American Media, publisher of National Enquirer, US Weekly, Men's Fitness
 Edgar Allan Poe (1809–1849) – author and poet
 Chaim Potok (1929–2002) – author
 Richard Price (born 1949) – novelist and screenwriter 
 Chris Regan (born 1967) – television writer and author
 Charles Rice-González (born 1964) – novelist and playwright
 Spider Robinson (born 1948) – science-fiction writer of novels and short stories
 Joanna Russ (1937–2011) – feminist science-fiction writer
 Oliver Sacks (1933–2015) – neurologist and author
 Douglas Sadownick – gay fiction writer, journalist and psychotherapist
 William Safire (1929–2009) – journalist, speech writer, literary stylist
 Tony Santiago (born 1950) – military historian
 Kate Simon (1912–1990) – memoirist and popular travel guide author
 Arthur Spiegelman (1940–2008) – journalist {not the author of Maus}
 William Steig (1907–2003) – cartoonist and author
 Mark Twain (1835–1910) – author
 Dorothy Uhnak (1930–2006) – mystery writer who drew upon her past experience as a NYPD detective
 Ben Wattenberg (1933–2015) – political/demographic analysis author (The Real Majority)
 Al Wasserman (1921–2005) – documentary filmmaker
 Barry Wellman (born 1942) – sociologist of community, networks and the Internet, co-author Networked
 Gene Weingarten (born 1951) – Pulitzer Prize-winning journalist, author and cartoonist
 Herman Wouk (1915–2019) – author

Film, television, radio, dance and theatre

 Charlie Ahearn (born 1951) – film director of Wild Style
 Danny Aiello (1933–2019) – actor
 Alan Alda (born 1936) – actor
 Nancy Allen (born 1955) – actress
 Woody Allen (born 1935) – film director and actor
 June Allyson (1917–2006) – actress
 Bruce Altman (born 1955) – actor
 Christopher Aponte – ballet dancer and choreographer
 Arthur Aviles (born 1963) – dancer and choreographer
 Emanuel Azenberg (born 1934) – theatrical producer
 Lauren Bacall (1924–2014) – actress
 Martin Balsam (1919–1996) – film actor
 Anne Bancroft (1931–2005) – actress
 Ellen Barkin (born 1954) – actress
 Joseph Bassolino (Joey Boots) (1967–2016) – comedian who popularized the phrase "Baba Booey" on the Howard Stern Show
 Peter S. Beagle (born 1939) – fantasy and science fiction author
 Tyson Beckford (born 1970) – model and actor
 Ahmed Best (born 1973) – Jar Jar Binks
 Joey Bishop (1918–2007) – entertainer
 Irving Brecher (1914–2008) – radio, television and film comedy writer
 Joy Bryant (born 1976) – actress
 Cara Buono (born 1974) – actress
 Red Buttons (1919–2006) – comedian and actor
 James Caan (1940–2022) – actor
 Steven Canals (born 1980) – television screenwriter and producer.
 George Carlin (1937–2008) – comedian
 Eddie Carmel, born Oded Ha-Carmeili (1936–1972) – Israeli-born entertainer with gigantism and acromegaly, popularly known as "The Jewish Giant"
 Paddy Chayefsky (1923–1981) – screenwriter
 Dominic Chianese (born 1931) – actor
 Sanford "Sandy" Climan (born 1956) – film producer
 Lee J. Cobb (1911–1976) – actor
 Kevin Corrigan (born 1969) – actor
 Tony Curtis (1925–2010) – actor
 Stacey Dash (born 1966) – actress
 Michael DeLorenzo (born 1959) – actor
 Desus (born 1983) – comedian, former host of Viceland's Desus and Mero and current host of Showtime's Desus & Mero
 The Kid Mero (born 1983) – comedian, former host of Viceland's Desus and Mero and current host of Showtime's Desus & Mero
 Richard Dubin (born 1945) – television writer, director and producer
 Peter Falk (1927–2011) – actor
 Jon Favreau (born 1966) – film and television director and actor
 Joe Franklin (1926–2015) – TV host of Joe Franklin's Memory Lane
 Cuba Gooding, Jr. (born 1968) – actor
 Howard Gottfried (1923–2017) – film producer of academy awarding winning Network and The Hospital
 Don Gregory (1934–2015) – Broadway theatrical producer
 Mortimer Halpern (1909–2006) – Broadway stage manager
 Jonathan Harris (1914–2002) – actor
 Moss Hart (1904–1961) – playwright and theatre director
 Amy Heckerling (born 1954) – film director
 Bernard Herrmann (1911–1975) – film composer
 Richard Hunt (1951–1992) – Muppet puppeteer
 Jharrel Jerome (born 1997) – actor 
 Robert Klein (born 1942) – comedian
 Yaphet Kotto (1939–2021) – actor
 Stanley Kubrick (1928–1999) – film director
 Saul Landau (1936–2013) – documentary filmmaker, journalist
 Annie Lanzillotto (born 1963) – actor, performance artist, director
 Tom Leykis (born 1956) – radio host
 Hal Linden (born 1931) – actor, director, and musician
 Lindsay Lohan (born 1986) – actress
 Louis Lombardi (born 1968) – actor
 Domenick Lombardozzi (born 1976) – actor
 Kenneth Lonergan (born 1962) – screenwriter, director, playwright
 Jennifer Lopez (born 1969) – singer, actress and dancer
 Linda Lovelace (1949–2002) – porn actor and anti-porn activist
 Melissa Manchester (born 1951) – singer
 Sonia Manzano (born 1950) – actress, Maria Figueroa Rodriguez on Sesame Street
 Garry Marshall (1934–2016) – television and film director
 Bernard McGuirk (1957-2022) – American radio personality
 Penny Marshall (1943–2018) – actor and director
 Lea Michele (born 1986) – actor
 Sal Mineo (1939–1976) – actor
 Tracy Morgan (born 1968) – actor and comedian 
 Romeo Muller (1928–1992) – television writer
 Robert Mulligan (1925–2008) – film director
 Jan Murray (1916–2006) – comedian
 Mwalim (born 1968) – playwright, actor, director; spoken-word artist; co-founder of the Urban Expressionists Lab
 Bess Myerson (1924–2014) – actor; best known as first Jewish Miss America
 Carroll O'Connor (1924–2001) – actor
 Okwui Okpokwasili (born 1972) – dancer, actor
 Jerry Orbach (1935–2004) – actor
 Toby Orenstein (born 1937) – founder and director of the Columbia Center for Theatrical Arts, the Young Columbians, and Toby's Dinner Theatre
 Ronnie Ortiz-Magro (born 1986) – participant on MTV's reality-television series Jersey Shore
 Al Pacino (born 1940) – actor
 Chazz Palminteri (born 1952) – actor
 Vincent Pastore (born 1946) – actor
 Ron Perlman (born 1950) – film actor; Hellboy, etc.
 Regis Philbin (1931–2020) – media personality and television talk-show host
 Carl Reiner (1922–2020) – comedian and film director
 Rob Reiner (born 1945) – actor and film director
 Kristina Reyes (born 1994) – actress and bass guitarist
 Martin Richards (1932–2012) – theater and movie producer
 Martin Ritt (1914–1990) – Academy Award-nominated movie director 
 Tanya Roberts (1955–2020) – actor
 Leon Robinson (born 1962) – actor
 Géza Röhrig (born 1967) – poet and film star of Son of Saul
 George Romero (1940–2017) – horror film director
 Saoirse Ronan (born 1994) – film actor
 Andre Royo (born 1968) – actor
 Harmony Santana (born ?) – transgender film actress starred in Gun Hill Road
 Mike Savage (born 1942) – radio talk-show host
 Robert Schimmel (1950–2010) – comedian
 Daniel Schorr (1918–2010) – journalist
 Ben Schwartz (born 1981) – actor and comedian
 John Patrick Shanley (born 1950) – playwright
 Maggie Siff (born 1974) – actor
 Neil Simon (1927–2018) – playwright and screenwriter
 Wesley Snipes (born 1962) – actor
 Lionel Stander (1908–1994) – actor
 Arnold Stang (1918–2009) – actor
 Joseph Stein (1912–2010) – playwright
 Renée Taylor (born 1933) – actress
 Rachel Ticotin (born 1958) – actress
 Tony Vitale (born 1964) – film writer, producer and director
 Kerry Washington (born 1977) – actress
 Douglas Watt (1914–2009) – theater critic
 Fred Weintraub (1928–2017) – founder and impresario of the Bitter End 1960s hippie club; producer of movies about Woodstock, Bruce Lee
 Burt Wolf (born 1938) – travel reporter and writer for CNN and ABC networks
 Malik Yoba (born 1967) – actor

Music

 A Boogie wit da Hoodie (born 1995) – rapper
 Afrika Bambaataa (born 1957) – disc jockey
 Miguel Angel Amadeo – Latin musician-composer and owner of Casa Amadeo music store
 Anthony Amato (1920–2011) – founder and director of Amato Opera
 Aventura (born 1996) – bachata music group
 B-Lovee (born 2000) – rapper
 The Barry Sisters – Yiddish-American singers from the 1930s to 1970s
 The Belmonts – late-1950s singing group, with Dion
 Jellybean Benitez (born 1957) – music producer credited with discovering Madonna
 Big Pun (1971–2000) – rapper
 Mary J. Blige (born 1971) – singer and songwriter 
 Angela Bofill (born 1954) – R&B singer and songwriter
 Busy Bee Starski (born 1962) – old-school rapper from the 1980s
 Jerry Calliste Jr (born 1965) – music-industry executive
 Cardi B (born 1992) – hip-hop recording artist
 Diahann Carroll (1935–2019) – actress and singer
 The Chiffons – early-1960s girl group
 Cheryl "Coko" Clemons (born 1970) – gospel singer and lead singer of R&B group
 Sean Combs (born 1969) – "Puff Diddy" rapper, singer, record producer, entrepreneur 
 Cold Crush Brothers – rap group
 Willie Colón (born 1950) – trombonist
 Judy Craig (born 1946) – lead singer of the Chiffons
 Cuban Link (born 1974) – hip-hop artist
 Bobby Darin (1936–1973) – 1950s–1960s singer
 Dennis Day (1916–1988) – comedian and singer; regular on Jack Benny radio and television programs
 Inspectah Deck (born 1970) – rapper; member of Wu-Tang Clan
 Kat DeLuna (born 1987) – 1950s–1960s singer
 Diamond D (born 1968) – hip-hop artist
 Dion DiMucci (born 1939) – singer-songwriter; 1950s–1960s rock singer
 DJ Chuck Chillout (born 1962) – disc jockey
 DJ Kool Herc (born 1955) – hip hop pioneer
 Dr. Buzzard's Original Savannah Band – 1970s disco group
 Drag On (born 1979) – rapper
 Arnold Eidus (1922–2013) – concert violinist and session musician
 Fat Joe (born 1970) – rapper
 Charles Fox (born 1940) – Grammy-winning composer
 Ace Frehley (born 1951) – Kiss guitarist
 Arlen Roth (Master of the Telecaster) (born 1952) – guitarist
 French Montana (born 1984) – rapper
 Ross "The Boss" Friedman (born 1954) – guitarist and founding member of The Dictators and Manowar
 Funkmaster Flex (born 1968) – disc jockey
 Kay Flock (born 2003) – rapper
 Funky Four Plus One – rap group
 Furious Five – rap group
 Bob Gaudio (born 1942) – Four Seasons principal songwriter and group member
 Stan Getz (1927–1991) – jazz musician
 Richard Goode (born 1943)  – classical pianist
 Eydie Gormé (1931–2013) – traditional pop music singer
 Grand Mixer DXT – disc jockey
 Grand Wizard Theodore (born 1963) – disc jockey
 Grandmaster Flash (born 1958) – disc jockey
 Cory Gunz (born 1987) – rapper
 Aaron Hall (born 1964) – R&B singer-songwriter
 Andre "Dr. Jeckyll" Harrell (born 1964) – half of rap duo Dr. Jeckyll & Mr. Hyde
 Richie Havens (1941–2013) – musician
 Heatmakerz – hip-hop producers
 Hell Rell (born 1979) – rapper
 Rita Houston (1961–2020) – Disk jockey, producer,  and program director of "The  Whole Wide World",
 Bobby Hutcherson (1941–2016) – jazz vibraphonist who lived in the Bronx in the 1960s 
 The Jaynetts (1961–1964) – singers, "Sally Go Round the Roses"
 Jazzy Five – rap group
 Billy Joel (born 1949) – singer
 Jim Jones (born 1976) – rapper, actor
 Helen Kane (1903–1966) – singer
 Kid Capri (born 1967) – disc jockey and producer
 Don Kirshner (1934–2011) – 1950s–1960s rock producer, 1970s television: "Rock Concert"
 Jann Klose – singer
 Kool Keith (born 1963) – hip-hop artist
 Joey Kramer (born 1950) – drummer from Aerosmith
 KRS-One (born 1965) – rapper
 La India (born 1969) – "The Princess of Salsa"
 Héctor Lavoe (1946–1993) – salsa singer
 Tom Lehrer (born 1928) – satirical songwriter and performer
 Leanne "Lelee" Lyons (born 1973) – member of R&B group SWV* 
 Lord Finesse (born 1970) – hip-hop artist
 Lord Tariq and Peter Gunz – hip-hop duo
 Jennifer Lopez (born 1969) – singer, actress and dancer
 Richard "Handsome Dick" Manitoba (born 1954) – singer, The Dictators, MC5 and Manitoba's Wild Kingdom; entertainer; radio DJ; saloon keeper
 Johnny Marks (1909–1985) – composer of "Rudolph the Red-Nosed Reindeer" and other songs
 Anthony McGill (musician) (born 1979) – principal clarinetist of New York Philharmonic
 Abel Meeropol (1903–1986) – composer of "Strange Fruit", "The House I Live In"; adoptive father of Rosenberg boys
 Melle Mel (born 1961) – rapper
 Alan Merrill (born 1951) – musician, singer, actor, model
 Helen Merrill (born 1930) – jazz singer
 Robert Moog (1934–2005) – inventor of the Moog synthesizer
 Jerry Moss (born 1935) – co-founder of A&M Records; owner of Zenyatta race horse
 Chris Moy (born 1992) – member of Menudo
 Mwalim (born 1968) – singer, pianist, composer, arranger, producer
 Nice & Smooth – rap duo
 Nine (born 1969) – rapper
 Laura Nyro (1947–1997) – composer and singer
 Jon Oliva (born 1960) – heavy-metal singer
 Adelina Patti (1843–1919) – opera singer
 Jan Peerce (1904–1984) – opera singer
 Murray Perahia (born 1947) – pianist and conductor
 Roberta Peters (1930–2017) – opera singer
 Positive K (born 1967) – rapper
 Tony Powers (born 1938) – actor, singer-songwriter, video artist
 Prince Royce (born 1989) – bachata singer-songwriter
 Tito Puente (1923–2000) – jazz musician
 Lenny Santos (born 1979)  – bachata producer, guitarist and songwriter 
 Rahzel (born 1964) – rapper, beatboxer
 Drew Ramos (born 1997) – singer from the group in Real Life
 Christopher "Kid" Reid (born 1964) – half of Kid 'n Play
 Remy Ma (born 1981) – rapper
 Jamar Rogers (born 1982) – singer
 Ron Suno (born 2000) – rapper
 Sadat X (born 1968) – rapper; member of Brand Nubian
 Romeo Santos (born 1981) – singer, bachata
 Gil Scott-Heron (1949–2011) – "godfather of rap"
 Sha EK (born 2003) – rapper
 Showbiz and A.G. – hip-hop duo
 Carly Simon (born 1943) – singer-songwriter
 Joanna Simon (1936–2022) – mezzo-soprano opera singer; MacNeil/Lehrer News Hour arts correspondent; older sister of Carly Simon and Lucy Simon
 Lucy Simon (1940–2022) – composer and older sister of Carly Simon
 Slick Rick (born 1965) – rapper
 Soulsonic Force – rap group
 Joey Spampinato (born 1948) – musician
 Phil Spector (1939–2021) – composer and arranger; murderer
 Regina Spektor (born 1980) – singer-songwriter
 Ice Spice (born 2000) – rapper
 Donna Stark (born 1948) – country singer-songwriter
 Maxine Sullivan (1911–1987) – jazz singer
 Swizz Beatz (born 1978) – record producer/rapper
 Max Santos (born 1982) – bass player, rapper
 T La Rock (born 1961) – rapper
 Ray Tabano (born 1946) – former guitarist and founding member of Aerosmith
 Tim Dog (1967–2013) – rapper
 Lil Tjay (born 2001) – rapper
 Arturo Toscanini (1867–1957) – cellist, conductor
 Doris Troy (1937–2004) – R&B singer and songwriter
 Richard Tucker (1913–1975) – operatic tenor, cantor, Temple Adath Israel
 Steven Tyler (born 1948) – frontman of Aerosmith
 Ultramagnetic MCs – rap group
 Dave Valentin (1952–2017) – Latin jazz flutist
 Luther Vandross (1951–2005) – singer
 Mario Vazquez (born 1977) – singer
 Veronica Vazquez (born 1975) – singer
 Louie Vega (born 1965) – disc jockey and music producer
 Jesse West (born 1967) – rapper, producer
 Christopher Williams (born 1967) – singer
 Peter Wolf (born 1946) – lead singer of The J. Geils Band
 Nanette Workman (born 1945) – Singer-songwriter. Backing vocalist Rolling Stones, Elton John, John Lennon

Government and politics

 Robert Abrams (born 1938) – Assemblyman, Bronx Borough President, New York State Attorney General
 Bella Abzug (1920–1998) – Congresswoman and international feminist leader
 Brian G. Andersson (born 1957) – former New York City Commissioner of Records & Information Services.
 Herman Badillo (1929–2014) – former New York City housing official, Bronx Borough President, Congressman and CUNY board of trustees chair
 Oxiris Barbot (born 1965/1966) – Commissioner of Health of the City of New York
 Mario Biaggi (1917–2015) – decorated policeman and US Congressman
 Adolfo Carrión, Jr. (born 1961) – former Bronx Borough President appointed by President Barack Obama to be Director of the White House Office of Urban Affairs
 Darcel Clark (born 1962) – first female Bronx County District Attorney
 Gray Davis (born 1942) – former Governor of California
 Rubén Díaz Jr. (born 1973) – Bronx borough president and former New York State assembly member
 Louis Farrakhan (born 1933) – Black Muslim leader
 Luis A. Gonzalez – first Latino to be named Presiding Justice of the New York State Appellate Division, First Judicial Department
 Alan Grayson (born 1958) – Democratic Congressman, Florida
 Eric Holder (born 1951) – first African American-appointed United States Attorney General
 Scott Israel (born 1956/57) – Police Chief of Opa-locka, former Sheriff of Broward County
 Martin Jezer (1940–2005) – progressive activist in New York and Vermont; leader of stutterers' self-help movement
 Lazarus Joseph (1891–1966) – NY State Senator and New York City Comptroller.
 Benjamin Kaplan (1911–2010) – law professor, judge, crafter of Nuremberg Trials indictments
 John F. Kennedy (1917–1963) – 35th President of the United States; U.S. Senator from Massachusetts (born in Brookline, Massachusetts)
 Bernard Kerik (born 1955) – former Commissioner of Police and of Corrections, New York City.
 Ed Koch (1924–2013) – politician; former U.S. Representative who became a three-term Mayor of New York City
 Kenneth Kronberg (1948–2007) – leading member of LaRouche Movement
 Fiorello H. La Guardia (1882–1947) – former Mayor of New York City
 Nita Lowey (born 1937) – Congresswoman served from 1989 to 2021 whose Westchester district once included parts of the Bronx and Queens
 Beatrice Lumpkin (born 1918) – union organizer
 Norman Marcus – former general counsel, New York City Planning Commission
 Francis W. Martin (1878–1947) – first Bronx County District Attorney
 Gouverneur Morris (1752–1816) – revolutionary war statesman
 Michael Mukasey (born 1941) – former U.S. judge and U.S. Attorney General (under George W. Bush)
 Alexandria Ocasio-Cortez (born 1989) – youngest woman ever elected to the U.S. House of Representatives, 2018
 Colin Powell (1937–2021) – former United States Secretary of State
 Anthony Romero (born 1965) – executive director of the American Civil Liberties Union
 Theodore Roosevelt (1858–1919) – U.S. president who spent boyhood summers at Wave Hill in the Riverdale section of The Bronx, New York City
 Frank Shannon (born 1961) – native of the Kingsbridge section of the Bronx, conservative activist, political analyst, columnist, and candidate for the Florida State House
 Larry Sharpe (born 1968) – 2018 Libertarian nominee for Governor of New York; 2016 Libertarian vice-presidential candidate
 Sonia Sotomayor (born 1954) – federal appeals court judge, New York; appointed by President Barack Obama to the Supreme Court of the United States
 Eliot Spitzer (born 1959) – politician and television talk-show host; former New York State Attorney General (1999–2006); Governor of New York (2007–2008)
 John Timoney (police officer) (1948–2016) – Philadelphia police commissioner; Miami police chief; New York City deputy police commissioner
 Leon Trotsky (1879–1940) – Soviet revolutionary and political theorist
 Charles J. Urstadt (born 1928) – gubernatorial advisor and appointee noted for development of Battery Park City and as namesake of contentious Urstadt Law

Sports

 Nate Archibald (born 1948) – former NBA player
 Albert Axelrod (1921–2004) – Olympic medalist foil fencer
 Elías Larry Ayuso (born 1977) – Puerto Rican basketball player
 Harrison Bader (born 1994) – MLB outfielder
 Margaret Bailes (born 1951) – Olympic gold medalist
 Iran Barkley (born 1960) – boxer
 Saquon Barkley (born 1997) – NFL player
 Bobby Bonilla (born 1963) – former MLB player
 Willie Cager – player on 1966 Texas Western University NCAA basketball championship team
 Rod Carew (born 1945) – Baseball Hall of Famer signed by the Minnesota Twins in the Bronx
 Willie Colon (born 1983) – former NFL player
 Cus D'Amato (1908–1985) – boxing manager
 Aaron Davis (born 1967) – boxer
 Bizunesh Deba (born 1987) – marathoner
 Art Donovan (1924–2013) – former NFL football tackle
 Mike "SuperJew" Epstein (born 1943) – MLB first baseman
 Chris Eubank (born 1966) – boxer
 Harry Feldman (1919–1962) – MLB pitcher
 Lou Gehrig (1903–1941) – Baseball Hall of Famer and New York Yankees first baseman
 Marty Glickman (1917–2001) – athlete and sports announcer
 Mitch Green (born 1957) – boxer
 Hank Greenberg (1911–1986) – MLB Hall of Famer
 Eric Holtz (born 1965) – Head Coach of the Israel national baseball team
 Daryl Homer (born 1990) – Olympic fencer
 Nat Holman (1896–1995) – Hall of Fame basketball player and coach 
 Jonathan Isaac (born 1997) – basketball player, Orlando Magic forward
 Cullen Jones (born 1984) – swimmer
 Max Kellerman (born 1973) – sports-radio host
 Ed Kranepool (born 1944) – former Major League Baseball player; New York Mets
 Marie Kruckel (1924–2012) – All-American Girls Professional Baseball League player
 Jake LaMotta (1921–2017) – boxer
 Fred Lewis (born 1947) – American-handball player
 Anibal Lopez (born 1942) – bodybuilder
 Doug Marrone (born 1964) – NFL coach
 Floyd Mayweather Sr. (born 1952) – boxing trainer
 Shep Messing (born 1949) – Olympic soccer goalkeeper and current broadcaster
 Nat Militzok (1923–2009) – basketball player
 Marvin Miller (1917–2012) – founder, Major League Baseball Players Association
 Davey Moore (1959–1988) – WBA world middleweight champion boxer
 Bernard Opper (1915–2000) – All-American basketball player for the Kentucky Wildcats and professional player
 Juan Orozco (born 1993) – champion gymnast, 2012 Olympian
 Justin Pierce (1975–2000) – skateboarder
 Ed Pinckney (born 1963) – basketball player, Villanova Wildcats Championship Team; 13-year NBA; Current Lead Assistant Coach, Minnesota Timberwolves
 Bill Polian (born 1942) – NFL executive
 Alex Ramos (born 1961) – boxer
 Tubby Raskin (1902–1981) – basketball player and coach
 T. J. Rivera (born 1988) – New York Mets infielder 
 Michele A. Roberts (born 1956) – executive director of NBA players' union
 Lennie Rosenbluth (born 1933) – basketball player
 Dolph Schayes (1928–2015) – Hall of Fame NBA basketball player and coach
 Babe Scheuer (1913–1997) – football player 
 Stephen A. Smith (born 1967) – commentator, ESPN First Take
 Vin Scully (1927–2022) – sportscaster 
 Amanda Serrano (born 1988) – IBF Female World Super Featherweight champion boxer
 Nevil Shed (born 1943) – player on 1966 Texas Western University NCAA basketball championship team
 Benjamin (Benji) Ungar (born 1986) – fencer
 Kemba Walker (born 1990) – basketball player; New York Knicks point guard
 Hilton White (1933–1990) – basketball coach and community leader
 Andrew Velazquez (born 1994) – MLB infielder

Name givers

 Thomas Cornell (1595–1655) – one of the earliest settlers of the Bronx (area now named Clason Point)
 Anne Hutchinson (1591–1643) – pioneer religious liberation
 Thomas Pell (1608–1669) – physician

Activists

 Murray Bookchin (1921–2006) – anarchist, social ecologist, libertarian socialist
 Roscoe Brown (1922–2016) – Tuskegee Airman, President 
 Stokely Carmichael (1941–1998) – Student Nonviolent Coordinating Committee leader in the 1960s U.S. Civil Rights Movement
 Majora Carter (born 1966) – MacArthur Genius Award-winning founder of Sustainable South Bronx
 Claudette Colvin (born 1939) – first person to be arrested protesting bus segregation in the U.S. South, in Montgomery, Alabama, March 2, 1955
 Ita Ford (1940–1980) – Maryknoll nun, murdered by Salvadoran death squad
 Jack Greenberg (1924–2016) – civil rights lawyer as head of NAACP Legal Defense and Education Fund for 23 years
 Ray McGovern (born 1939) – retired Central Intelligence Agency officer turned political activist
 Maurice Paprin (1920–2005) – Mitchell Lama apartments developer and social activist
 Arlyn Phoenix (born 1943) – head of River Phoenix Center for Peacebuilding; mother of Joaquin Phoenix, River Phoenix
 Sally Regenhard (born 1946) – 9/11 activist; Co-op City resident
 Sylvia Rivera (1951–2002) – transgender activist, "the Rosa Parks of the transgender movement" 
 Jim Steyer (born 1956) – child advocate
 Stephen Spiro (1939–2007) – conscientious objector and Vietnam War opponent
 Elizabeth Sturz (1917–2010) – founder of Argus Community and Harbor House; folklorist with husband Alan Lomax
 Gary Waldron (born 1943) – founder of Glie Farms, commercial organic herb garden in low-income neighborhood.
 Suzanne (Werner) Wright (1946–2016) – co-founder of Autism Speaks

Business

 Joseph Beninati (born 1964) – real estate developer and private equity investor
 Chris Bianco – chef, born in the Bronx
 Lloyd Blankfein (born 1954) – businessman; chief executive officer of Goldman Sachs (since 2006)
 Eli Broad (1933–2021) – businessman and arts philanthropist; co-founder of Kaufman & Broad
 B. Gerald Cantor (1916–1996) – businessman; co-founder of securities firm Cantor Fitzgerald; with his wife Iris, amassed and then donated the largest private collection of sculptures by Auguste Rodin
 Stanley Chais (1926–2010) – investment advisor in the Madoff investment scandal
 Marco Dedivanovic (born 1983) – Award-winning make-up artist and businessman.
 Fred DeLuca (1947–2015) – founder and CEO of Subway fast food sandwich chain
 Richelieu Dennis – co-founder of Sundial Brands personal care products.
 Millard "Mickey" Drexler" (born 1944) – businessman; chief executive officer of J. Crew; former chief executive officer of the Gap
 Reggie Fils-Aimé (born 1961) – president of Nintendo of America
 Michael J. Freeman (born 1947) – inventor, educator, business consultant, and entrepreneur
 Mike Greco (1929–2019) – 'salami king'
 Harry Helmsley (1909–1997) – real estate magnate in New York City
 Roger Hertog (born 1941) – co-founder of investment firm; co-publisher of The New Republic magazine; philanthropist
 Richard March Hoe (1812–1886) – inventor of rotary printing press
 Collis Potter Huntington (1821–1900) – railroad and shipbuilding magnate; created the privately endowed Huntington Free Library and Reading Room near his summer home in the Throggs Neck neighborhood of the Bronx
 Elaine Kaufman (1929–2010) – businessperson; proprietor of Elaine's, a restaurant in the Manhattan borough of New York City that was a haunt of writers, actors, politicians
 Calvin Klein (born 1942) – clothing designer
 Ralph Lauren (born 1939) – clothing designer
 George Lois (born 1932) – advertising
 William E. Macaulay (1945–2019) – billionaire businessman; CEO and chairman of First Reserve Corporation; co-founder of William E. Macaulay Honors College of City University of New York
 Reuben and Rose Mattus (1912–1994; 1916–2006) – founders of Häagen-Dazs ice cream
 Walton McCarthy (born 1951) – businessman and principal mechanical engineer with NORAD Shelter Systems 
 George Meany (1894–1980) – labor union leader: first president of the AFL–CIO
 Jordan L. Mott (1799–1866) – inventor of coal kitchen stove, founder of J.L. Mott Ironworks in Mott Haven, and developer of the South Bronx neighborhood now named after him 
 Mark Penn (born 1954) – chief executive officer of the public-relations firm Burson-Marsteller; president of the polling firm Penn, Schoen and Berland Associates
 Sol Price (1916–2009) – founder of the Price Club and FedMart retail stores
 Lewis Salton (1910–1997) – inventor and manufacturer of the Salton Hotray
 Fred Schwartz (1931–2016) – furrier, known nationally as "Fred the Furrier"
 Sy Sperling (1941–2020) – founder, long-time head and TV commercial star of HairClub
 Fred Trump (1905–1999) – real estate developer; father of Donald Trump

Attorneys
 William Barr (born 1950) – U.S. Attorney General under Donald Trump
 Pat Cipollone (born 1966) – Trump lawyer in impeachment case and elsewhere
 Larry Fleisher (1930–1989) – sports agent, helped found the National Basketball Association Players Association
 Hal Kant (1931–2008) – specializing in representing musical groups, spent 35 years as principal lawyer and general counsel for the Grateful Dead
 Irving Picard (born 1941) –  known for his recovery of funds from the Madoff investment scandal 
 Gerald Shur (1933–2020) – founder of the United States Federal Witness Protection Program
 Melvyn Weiss (1935–2018) – co-founded plaintiff class action law firm Milberg Weiss

Infamous

 David Berkowitz (born 1953) – "Son of Sam" serial killer
 Evgeny Buryakov (born 1975) – Russian spy
 Richard Cottingham (born 1946) – serial killer
 Larry Davis (1966–2008) – drug dealer; shot multiple police officers
 John Gotti (1940–2002) – crime boss
 Sidney Gottlieb (1918–1999) – American chemist who led the Central Intelligence Agency's 1950s–1960s assassination attempts and mind control program, known as Project MKUltra
 Moshe Lax (born 1974) – partner in Ivanka Trump Fine Jewelry; subject of multiple lawsuits
 Jeffry Picower (1942–2009) – investor and philanthropist involved in the Madoff investment scandal
 Morton Sobell (1917–2018) –  convicted along with Julius Rosenberg and Ethel Rosenberg in 1951 of being a spy for the Soviet Union 
 Howard Spira (born 1959) – instrumental in George Steinbrenner's ban from baseball

See also

 List of people from New York City
 List of people from Brooklyn
 List of people from Queens
 List of people from Staten Island

References

Bronx
People